A microgenre is a specialized or niche genre. The term has been used since at least the 1970s to describe highly specific subgenres of music, literature, film, and art. In music, examples include the myriad sub-subgenres of heavy metal and electronic music. Some genres are sometimes retroactively created by record dealers and collectors as a way to increase the monetary value of certain records, with early examples including Northern soul, freakbeat, garage punk, and sunshine pop. By the early 2010s, most microgenres were linked and defined through various outlets on the Internet, usually as part of generating popularity and hype for a newly perceived trend. Examples of these include chillwave, witch house, seapunk, shitgaze, vaporwave, and cloud rap.

Etymology and definition
Hyper-specific formulas and subgenres have always featured in popular culture. In a 1975 French article about historical fiction, "microgenre" and "macrogenre" were invoked as concepts. The author defined microgenres as "a narrowly defined group of texts connected in time and space", whereas macrogenres are "more diffuse and harder to generalize about." Further discussion of the microgenre concept appeared in various critical works of 1980s and 1990s.

Music

Early history
Historically, with respect to usage in music, microgenres were usually labelled by writers seeking to define a new style by linking together a group of seemingly disparate artists. For example, when Lenny Kaye invoked the phrase "garage-punk" in liner notes for the 1971 compilation Nuggets, it effectively created a style of rock music that, until then, was nameless and lingering in obscurity. The process of recognition for "power pop" was similarly formulated by a circle of rock writers who advocated their own annotated history of the genre. Music journalist Simon Reynolds has suggested that early examples of "genre-as-retroactive-fiction" include "Northern soul" and "garage punk", both of which were coined in the early 1970s, and later followed by "freakbeat" and "sunshine pop". According to Reynolds such "semi-invented" genres were sometimes pushed by record dealers and collectors to increase the monetary value of the original records.

Successful attempts that resulted in widespread usage include "post-rock" (Reynolds) and "hauntology" (Mark Fisher). In the mid 1990s, Melody Maker journalists went so far as to make up fictional bands to justify the existence of an updated New Romantic scene they dubbed "Romantic Modernism". That same decade, there was a trend of electronic and dance music producers who created specialized descriptions of their music as a way to assert their individuality. In the instance of trance music, this desire led to "progressive trance", "Goa trance", "deep psytrance", and "hard trance". House, drum-n-bass, dubstep and techno also contain a large number of microgenres.

Digital age

The concept of microgenres gained prominence during the digital age, and despite its earlier history, is more often associated with later trends.  The speed at which microgenres achieve recognition and familiarity also accelerated substantially. This 21st-century "microgenre explosion" was partly a consequence of "software advances, faster internet connections, and the globalized proliferation of music".

In 2009, a writer for the New York Times observed that indie rock was then evolving into "an ever-expanding, incomprehensibly cluttered taxonomy of subgenres." By the early 2010s, most microgenres were linked and defined through various outlets on the internet. Examples of these include chillwave, witch house, seapunk, shitgaze, vaporwave, and cloud rap. Each of them, according to Vice writer Ezra Marcus, were "music scenes [created] out of thin air". Pitchforks Jonny Coleman commented: "The line between a real genre that sounds fake and a fake genre that could be real is as thin as ever, if existent at all. This is the uncanny genre valley that publicists-cum-neologicians live in and for."

Chillwave—termed sarcastically in a 2009 blog post—was one of the first music genres to formulate online. The term did not gain mainstream currency until early 2010, when it was the subject of articles by the Wall Street Journal and the New York Times. Writing in 2019, journalist Emilie Friedlander, called chillwave "the internet electronic micro-genre that launched a hundred internet electronic micro-genres (think: vaporwave, witch house, seapunk, shitgaze, distroid, hard vapor), not to mention its corollaries in this decade’s internet rap, which largely shared its collagist, hyper-referential approach to sound."

Criticism
In 2010, The Atlantics Llewellyn Hinkes Johns referenced the succession of chillwave, glo-fi, and hypnagogic pop as a "prime example" of a cycle involving the invention of a new category that is quickly and "brazenly denounced, sometimes in the same article". Grantlands Dave Schilling describes the "chillwave" designation as a pivotal moment that "revealed how arbitrary and meaningless labels like that really are. It wasn't a scene. It was a parody of a scene, both a defining moment for the music blogosphere and the last gasp." PopMatters Thomas Britt argued that the "staggering number of niches created by writers and commenters to 'distinguish' musical acts is ultimately binding. If a band plays along and tailors itself to a category, then its fortunes are likely tied to the shelf life of that category."

Other fields
The spread of digital publishing in the 21st century led to the rise of ever-more niche microgenres in literature – from Amish romance to NASCAR passion.

In 2020, Netflix identified 76,897 different microgenres in its algorithms, which it had used to develop successful series like House of Cards and Orange Is the New Black.

List of microgenres

See also

 Internet aesthetic
 Heavy metal genres
 Punk rock genres
 Hardcore punk subgenres
 Industrial music genres
 "Writing about music is like dancing about architecture"

References

Bibliography

Further reading
 
 

 
Musical subcultures
Music journalism